Marcella (325–410) is a saint in the Roman Catholic Church and Orthodox Church. She was a Christian ascetic in the Byzantine Era.  According to Butler, "Having lost her husband in the seventh month of her marriage, she rejected the suit of Cerealis the consul, uncle of Gallus Cæsar, and resolved to imitate the lives of the ascetics of the East. She abstained from wine and flesh, employed all her time in pious reading, prayer, and visiting the churches of the apostles and martyrs, and never spoke with any man alone."

After her husband's early death, she decided to devote the rest of her life to charity, prayer, and mortification of the flesh. Although some have reported that she was killed by Alaric, king of the Visigoths because he was convinced that she had hidden treasure, Butler reports, that although Marcella was scourged by the soldiers for the treasures which she had long before distributed among the poor, she begged for compassion for herself and her spiritual pupil, Principia. The soldiers granted them both sanctuary in the Church of St Paul, and she lived "a short time, which she spent in tears, prayers, and thanksgiving, closed her eyes by a happy death, in the arms of St. Principia, about the end of August, in 410." Perhaps because she did not live long after being scourged, she was included in the Roman Martyrology on the 31st of January. More recently The Oxford Dictionary of the Christian Church reports similarly, "She suffered bodily ill-treatment at the hands of the Goths when they captured Rome in 410 and died from its effects."

Biography
She came from a noble family, and her Aventine Hill palace became a center of Christian activity.  She was an associate of Paula of Rome.  Jerome corresponded with her, and he called her "the glory of the ladies of Cadereyta."  When the Goths invaded in 410, she was brutalized, and she died of her injuries. In Judy Chicago's The Dinner Party, it is stated that she dies in the arms of her favorite pupil, Principia. Her feast day in the west is January 31. Jerome's To Principia is a biography of her life.

In modern collections of Jerome's letters, we find many letters to Marcella (Letters 23, 25, 26, 29, 34, 127). Almost a third of all the extant letters from Jerome were addressed to women. Thomas Lawler, notes, “Marcella is by far the woman most frequently addressed, quite likely because of her leading position in that celebrated circle of religious-minded women that met at her house on the Aventine.” Most of what we know about Marcella is from the letters of Jerome, most famously his letter 127 to Principia. It was written on the occasion of Marcella's death, paying tribute to her life and consoling her beloved student. In it, he says the following about his relationship with Marcella:

As in those days my name was held in some renown as that of a student of the Scriptures, she never came to see me without asking me some questions about them, nor would she rest content at once, but on the contrary would dispute them; this, however, was not for the sake of argument, but to learn by questioning the answers to such objections might, as she saw, be raised. How much virtue and intellect, how much holiness and purity I found in her I am afraid to say, both lest I may exceed the bounds of men's belief and lest I may increase your sorrow by reminding you of the blessings you have lost. This only will I say, that whatever I had gathered together by long study, and by constant meditation made part of my nature, she tasted, she learned and made her own.

The artwork The Dinner Party by Judy Chicago features a place setting for Marcella. The Dinner Party is in the permanent collection at the Elizabeth A. Sackler Center for Feminist Art at the Brooklyn Museum. In her place setting there is the history of Marcella, who was the Roman founder of the first religious community for women in the Western church.

Marcella of Rome is honored with a Lesser Feast on the liturgical calendar of the Episcopal Church in the United States of America on January 31.

References

Sources
Catholic Online

Further reading
Kraemer, Ross S., ed. Maenads, Martyrs, Matrons, Monastics: A Sourcebook on Women's Religions in the Greco-Roman World. 1988; rev. ed., Oxford and New York: Oxford University Press, 2004.
Wright, F. A., trans. Jerome: Select Letters. 1933; reprint ed., Cambridge, Mass.: Harvard University Press, 1999.

325 births
410 deaths
5th-century Roman women
Ascetics
5th-century Christian saints
Anglican saints